Screaming Blue Murder may refer to:

Screaming Blue Murder (Blue Murder album)
Screaming Blue Murder (Girlschool album)